Governor Handley may refer to:

George Handley (politician) (1752–1793), 18th Governor of Georgia
Harold W. Handley (1909–1972), 40th Governor of Indiana

See also
Frank Hanly (1863–1920), 26th Governor of Indiana